An anthology series is a radio, television, video game or film series that spans different genres and presents a different story and a different set of characters in each different episode, season, segment, or short. These usually have a different cast in each episode, but several series in the past, such as Four Star Playhouse, employed a permanent troupe of character actors who would appear in a different drama each week. Some anthology series, such as Studio One, began on radio and then expanded to television.

Etymology 
The word comes from Ancient Greek ἀνθολογία (anthología, “flower-gathering”), from ἀνθολογέω (anthologéō, "I gather flowers"), from ἄνθος (ánthos, "flower") + λέγω (légō, "I gather, pick up, collect"), coined by Meleager of Gadara circa 60 BCE, originally as Στέφανος (στέφανος (stéphanos, "garland")) to describe a collection of poetry, later retitled anthology – see Greek Anthology. Anthologiai were collections of small Greek poems and epigrams, because in Greek culture the flower symbolized the finer sentiments that only poetry can express.

Radio 
Many popular old-time radio programs were anthology series. On some series, such as Inner Sanctum Mysteries, the only constant was the host, who introduced and concluded each dramatic presentation. One of the earliest such programs was The Collier Hour, broadcast on the NBC Blue Network from 1927 to 1932. As radio's first major dramatic anthology, it adapted stories and serials from Collier's Weekly in a calculated move to increase subscriptions and compete with The Saturday Evening Post. Airing on the Wednesday prior to each week's distribution of the magazine, the program soon moved to Sundays in order to avoid spoilers with dramatizations of stories simultaneously appearing in the magazine.

Drama 
 Academy Award Theater
 Arch Oboler's Plays
 The Campbell Playhouse
 Cavalcade of America
 CBS Radio Workshop
 Earplay
 Four Star Playhouse
 Lux Radio Theater
 Hollywood Star Time
 The Mercury Theatre on the Air
 The Screen Guild Theater
 Stars over Hollywood

Genre series 

Radio anthology series provided a format for science fiction, horror, suspense, and mystery genres (all produced in the US, unless noted):

 Mystery House (1929–c. 1944)
 The Witch's Tale (1931–38) (written by Alonzo Deen Cole)
 Lights Out (1934–47) (written by Wyllis Cooper/Arch Oboler)
 The Hermit's Cave (1935–c. 1945)
 Famous Jury Trials (1936–49)
 Dark Fantasy (1941–42) (written by Scott Bishop)
 Inner Sanctum Mysteries (1941–52) (created by Himan Brown)
 The Whistler (1942–55)
 Suspense (1942–62)
 The Mysterious Traveler (1943–52) (written by Robert Arthur, Jr. and narrated by Maurice Tarplin)
 Creeps by Night (1944)
 Mystery Playhouse (1944) (hosted by Peter Lorre)
 The Strange Dr. Weird (1944–45) (15-minute shorts, written by Robert Arthur, Jr. and narrated by Maurice Tarplin)
 The Haunting Hour (1944–46)
 The Sealed Book (1945) (written by Robert Arthur, Jr.)
 Mystery in the Air (1945–47) (starring Peter Lorre)
 The Weird Circle (1946–47)
 Murder at Midnight (1946–50)
 Quiet, Please! (1947–49) (written by Wyllis Cooper, starring Ernest Chappell)
 Escape (1947–54)
 The Unexpected (1948) (15-minute shorts)
 Destination Freedom (1948–50)
 Murder by Experts (1949–51)
 The Hall of Fantasy  (1949–53)
 2000 Plus (1950–52) (the first adult science fiction series on radio)
 Dimension X (1950–51) (featured adapted stories by authors including Isaac Asimov, Ray Bradbury and Kurt Vonnegut)
 ABC Mystery Theater (1951–54), anthology, crime and mystery series
 Sleep No More (1952–56) (featured Nelson Olmsted narrating his own adaptations of stories)
 Theater 10:30 (1955) (Canadian)
 X Minus One (1955–58) (revival and continuation of Dimension X)

The final episode of Suspense was broadcast on September 30, 1962, a date that has traditionally been seen as marking the end of the old-time radio era. However, genre series produced since 1962 include:

 The Black Mass (1963–67)
 The Creaking Door (1964–65) (South African)
 Beyond Midnight (1968–69) (South African)
 The Zero Hour (1973–74) (hosted by Rod Serling)
 Mystery Theater (1974–82) (created by Himan Brown of Inner Sanctum Mysteries)
 Nightfall (1980–83) (Canadian)
 The Cabinet of Dr. Fritz (1984–85) (broadcast in "3D-Sound" stereo)
 2000X (2000) (literary adaptations)
 The Twilight Zone (2002–03)

Television 

In the history of television, live anthology dramas were especially popular during the Golden Age of Television of the 1950s with series such as The United States Steel Hour and The Philco Television Playhouse.

Dick Powell came up with an idea for an anthology series, Four Star Playhouse, with a rotation of established stars every week, four stars in all. The stars would own the studio and the program, as Lucille Ball and Desi Arnaz had done successfully with Desilu studio. Powell had intended for the program to feature himself, Charles Boyer, Joel McCrea, and Rosalind Russell. When Russell and McCrea backed out, David Niven came on board as the third star. The fourth star was initially a guest star. CBS liked the idea, and Four Star Playhouse made its debut in fall of 1952. It ran on alternate weeks only during the first season, alternating with Amos 'n' Andy. It was successful enough to be renewed and became a weekly program from the second season until the end of its run in 1956. Ida Lupino was brought on board as the de facto fourth star, though unlike Powell, Boyer, and Niven, she owned no stock in the company.

American television networks would sometimes run summer anthology series which consisted of unsold television pilots. Beginning in 1971, the long-run Masterpiece Theatre drama anthology series brought British productions to American television.

In 2011, American Horror Story debuted a new type of anthology format in the U.S. Each season, rather than each episode, is a standalone story. Several actors have appeared in the various seasons, but playing different roles—in an echo of the Four Star Playhouse format.

The success of American Horror Story has spawned other season-long anthologies such as American Crime Story and True Detective.

American drama 

 The 20th Century Fox Hour (1955–57)
 ABC Movie of the Week (1969–75)
 ABC Stage 67 (1966–67)
 Academy Theatre (1949)
 Actors Studio (1948–50)
 Alcoa-Goodyear Theatre (1957–58)
 The Alcoa Hour (1955–57)
 Alcoa Premiere (1961–63)
 American Crime (2015–17)
 American Crime Story (2016–present)
 American Horror Story (2011–present)
 American Film Theatre (1973–75)
 American Playhouse (1981–94)
 The American Playwrights Theater: The One Acts (1989–90)
 The American Short Story (1974–80)
 Appointment with Adventure (1955–56)
 Armstrong Circle Theatre (1950–57)
 The Barbara Stanwyck Show (1960–61)
 Behind Closed Doors (1958–59)
 The Best of Broadway (1954–55)
 The Best of the Post (1960–61)
 Betty Crocker Star Matinee (1951–52)
 The Bigelow Theatre (1950–51)
 The Billy Rose Show, also known as Billy Rose's Playbill (1950–51)
 Bob Hope Presents the Chrysler Theatre (1963–67)
 The Bold Ones (1969–73)
 Broadway Television Theatre (1952–54)
 Buick-Electra Playhouse (1959–60)
 Cameo Theatre (1950–55)
 Camera Three (1955–79)
 The Campbell Playhouse, also known as Campbell Soundstage and Campbell Summer Soundstage (1952–54)
 Cavalcade of America (1952–57)
 CBS Playhouse (1967–70)
 CBS Summer Playhouse (1987–89)
 CBS Television Workshop (1952)
 CBS Workshop, also known as CBS Repertoire Workshop (1960)
 Celanese Theatre (1951–52)
 Celebrity Playhouse (1955–56)
 Center Stage (1954)
 Cheer Television Theatre (1954)
 The Chevrolet Tele-Theatre also known as Chevrolet on Broadway (1948–50)
 Chevron Hall of Stars (1956)
 Chevron Theatre (1952–53)
 Climax! (1954–58)
 Colgate Theatre (1949–50)
 Colgate Theatre (1958)
 Conflict (1956–57)
 Conrad Nagel Theater (1955)
 Cosmopolitan Theatre (1951)
 Crown Theatre with Gloria Swanson (1952–55)
 Curtain Call (1952)
 Damon Runyon Theater (1955–56)
 The Danny Thomas Hour (1967–68)
 The David Niven Show (1959)
 Deadline (1959–61)
 Death Valley Days (1952–70)
 Decision (1958)
 Demi-Tasse Tales (1953)
 The Dick Powell Show (1961–63)
 Dispatches from Elsewhere (2020)
 Douglas Fairbanks, Jr., Presents, also known as Rheingold Theatre (1953–57)
 Drama at Eight (1953)
 DuMont Royal Theater (1951–52)
 The DuPont Show of the Month (1957–61)
 The DuPont Show of the Week (1961–64)
 The DuPont Show with June Allyson (1959–61)
 The Elgin Hour (1954–55)
 The Errol Flynn Theatre (1956–57)
 Ethel Barrymore Theatre (1956)
 Faith Baldwin Romance Theatre (1951)
 Fargo (2014–present)
 Feud (2017–present)
 Fireside Theater (1949–58)
 The First Lady (2022)
 Footlights Theater (1952–53)
 Ford Star Jubilee (1955–56)
 Ford Television Theatre (1952–57)
 Ford Theatre (1948–51)
 Four Star Playhouse (1952–56)
 GE True (1962–63)
 General Electric Theater (1953–62)
 General Electric Summer Originals (1956)
 Genius (2017–present)
 Goodyear Television Playhouse (1951–57)
 Goodyear Theatre (1957–60)
 Great Performances (1971–present)
 Gruen Playhouse, also known as Gruen Guild Theatre (1951–53)
 The Gulf Playhouse (1952–53)
 Hallmark Hall of Fame (1951–present)
 The Haunting (2018–present)
 Hollywood Premiere Theatre, also known as Hollywood Theatre Time (1950–51)
 International Playhouse (1951)
 John Waters Presents Movies That Will Corrupt You (2006)
 The Joseph Cotten Show, also known as On Trial (1956–59)
 Joseph Schildkraut Presents (1953–54)
 The Kaiser Aluminum Hour (1956–57)
 Kraft Television Theatre (1947–58)
 Law & Order True Crime (2017–present)
 The Lloyd Bridges Show (1962–63)
 The Loretta Young Show (1953–61)
 Lottery! (1983–84)
 Love Story (1954)
 Love Story (1973–74)
 Lux Playhouse (1958–59)
 Lux Video Theater (1950–59)
 The Magnavox Theatre (1950)
 The Mail Story (1954)
 Masterpiece Contemporary (2008–11)
 Masterpiece Playhouse (1950)
 Masterpiece Theatre (1971–present)
 Matinee Theatre (1955–58)
 Max Liebman Spectaculars, also known as Max Liebman Presents (1954–56)
 Medallion Theatre, also known as Chrysler Medallion Theatre (1953–54)
 MGM Parade (1955–56)
 The Millionaire (1955–60)
 Monodrama Theater (1953)
 The Motorola Television Hour (1953–54)
 Mr. Citizen (1955)
 The Nash Airflyte Theater (1950–51)
 NBC Presents (1949–50)
 NBC Television Opera Theatre (1950–64)
 NET Playhouse (1964–72)
 New York Television Theatre (1965–70)
 Night Editor (1954)
 Nine Thirty Curtain (1953–54)
 The O. Henry Playhouse (1957)
 One Man's Experience (1952–53)
 One Woman's Experience (1952–53)
 Orient Express (1953)
 The Passerby (1951–56)
 The Pepsi-Cola Playhouse (1953–55)
 Personal Appearance Theater (1951–52)
 The Philco-Goodyear Television Playhouse (1948–56)
 The Philco Television Playhouse (1948–55)
 The Philip Morris Playhouse (1953–54)
 The Play of the Week (1959–61)
 Playhouse 90 (1956–60)
 Playwrights '56 (1956)
 Plymouth Playhouse also known as ABC Album (1953–54)
 Ponds Theater, also known as Kraft Television Theater (1953–57)
 Producers' Showcase (1954–57)
 Program Playhouse (1949)
 Prudential Family Playhouse (1950–51)
 Pulitzer Prize Playhouse (1950–52)
 Pulse of the City (1953–54)
 Pursuit (1958–59)
 The Revlon Mirror Theater (1953)
 The Richard Boone Show (1963–64)
 The Robert Herridge Theatre (1960–61)
 Robert Montgomery Presents (1950–57)
 Romance, also known as Theatre of Romance (1949–50)
 Romance Theatre (1982–83)
 Room 104 (2017–20)
 The Schaefer Century Theatre (1952)
 Schilling Playhouse (1959–60)
 Schlitz Playhouse of Stars (1951–59)
 Scream (2015–)
 Screen Associates Films (1952–53)
 Screen Director's Playhouse (1955–56)
 The Seven Lively Arts (1957–58)
 Short Short Dramas (1952–53)
 The Silver Theatre (1949–50)
 Somerset Maugham TV Theatre (1950–51)
 Stage 7 (1955–56)
 The Star and the Story (1955–56)
 Star Stage (1955–56)
 Star Tonight (1955–56)
 Starlight Theatre (1950–51)
 Stars Over Hollywood (1950–51)
 Startime (1959–60)
 Studio One (1948–58)
 Studio 57 (1954–58)
 Summer Playhouse (1964–67)
 Sunday Showcase (1959–60)
 Sweepstakes (1979)
 Telephone Time (1956–58)
 Television Playhouse (1947–48)
 Television Theatre (1950)
 Theatre Hour (1949–50)
 Theatre of the Mind (1949)
 Theatre '62 (1961–62)
 Tonight on Broadway (1948–49)
 The Trap (1950)
 TriBeCa (1993)
 True Detective (2014–present)
 TV Reader's Digest (1955–56)
 The United States Steel Hour (1953–63)
 Unsolved (2018–present)
 Vacation Playhouse (1963–67)
 Visions (1976–80)
 Warner Bros. Presents (1955–56)
 The Watcher (1995)
 Westinghouse Desilu Playhouse (1958–60)
 Willys Theatre Presenting Ben Hecht's Tales of the City (1953)
 Windows (1955)
 Your Favorite Story (1953–55)
 Your Jeweler's Showcase (1952–53)
 Your Show Time (1949)
 Your Story Theatre (also known as Story Theatre and Durkee Story Theatre) (1950–51)

Anime 

 Cooking' Idol Ai! Mai! Main! (2009-2013)
 Gokujō!! Mecha Mote Iinchō (2009-2011)
 Hakken Taiken Daisuki! Shimajirō (2008-2010)
 Mewkledreamy Mix! (2008-2010)
 Miracle! Mimika (2006-2009)
 Pretty Rhythm: Aurora Dream (2011-2012)
 Pretty Rhythm: Dear My Future (2012-2013)
 Pretty Rhythm: Rainbow Live (2013-2014)
 Shimajirō Hesoka (2010-2012)
 Shimajirō no Wow! (2012-present)
 Shugo Chara! Party! (2009-2010)
 Shūkan Storyland (1999-2001)

British drama 

 Armchair 30 (1973)
 Armchair Theatre (1956–74)
 Armchair Mystery Theatre (1960, 1964, 1965)
 Armchair Thriller (1978–81)
 BBC Play of the Month (1965–83)
 BBC Sunday-Night Theatre (1950–59)
 BBC2 Playhouse (1973–83)
 Black Mirror (2011–)
 A Choice of Coward (1964)
 City '68 (1967–68)
 The Canterbury Tales (2003)
 Creeped Out (2017–)
 Drama (1977)
 Escape (1957)
 Gaslight Theatre (1965)
 H.M. Tennent Globe Theatre (1956)
 Hour of Mystery (1957)
 Inside No 9 (2014–)
 ITV Play of the Week (1955–74)
 ITV Playhouse (1967–82)
 ITV Sunday Night Theatre (1969–74)
 ITV Sunday Night Drama (1959–80)
 Festival (1963–64)
 Late Night Theatre (1972–74)
 Love Story (1963–74)
 London Playhouse (1955–56)
 Moving On (2009–)
 National Theatre Live (2009–)
 Orson Welles' Great Mysteries ( 1973–74)
 Performance (1991–98)
 Play for Today (1970–84)
 Play for Tomorrow (1982)
 Playhouse Presents (2012–14)
 Saturday Playhouse (1958–60)
 Second City Firsts (1973–78)
 Screen One (1989–93)
 Screen Two (1985–94)
 Skins (2007–13)
 Stage 2 (1971–72)
 Tales of the Unexpected (1979–88)
 Theatre Night (1985–90)
 Theatre Parade (1936–37)
 Theatre 70 (1960–61)
 Theatre 625 (1964–68)
 Theatre Royal (1955–56)
 Thirty-Minute Theatre (1965–73)
 Thursday Theatre (1964–65)
 The Afternoon Play (2003–07)
 The Wednesday Play (1964–70)
 Wales Playhouse (1990–96)
 Weekend Playhouse (1984)

Canadian drama 

 First Performance (1955–58)
 General Motors Theatre (1953–61)
 Encounter (1958)
 Norman Corwin Presents (1972)
 On Camera (1954–58)
 Playdate (1961–64)

Indian drama 

 Aahat (1995–15)
 Bible Ki Kahaniya (1993–95)
 Gumrah: End of Innocence (2012–16)
 Hoshiyar… Sahi Waqt, Sahi Kadam (2016–17)
 Ishq Kills (2014)
 Kabhie Kabhie (2003 TV series) (2003)
 Katha Sagar (1986)
 Kaun Hai? (2018–)
 Kirdaar (1993–94)
 Koi Aane Ko Hai (2009)
 Khidki (2016)
 Kya Hadsaa Kya Haqeeqat (2002–04)
 Laal Ishq (2018 TV series) (2018–)
 Love by Chance (2014–15)
 MTV Big F (2015–17)
 Pyaar Tune Kya Kiya (TV series) (2014–)
 Rishtey (TV series) (1997–2001)
 Robi Thakurer Golpo (2015–16)
 Saturday Suspense (2018–20)
 Star Bestsellers (1999–2000)
 Stories by Rabindranath Tagore (2015–)
 Teri Meri Love Stories (2012)
 Twist wala love
 Yeh Hai Aashiqui (2013–16)
 Yule Love Story (1993–95)

Pakistani drama 

 Kitni Girhain Baaki Hain (2011–14)
 Sasural Ke Rang Anokhay (2012–13)
 Shareek-e-Hayat (2014–15)
 Kitni Girhain Baqi Hain! Phir Se (2016–17)
 Ustani Jee (2018)
 Kabhi Band Kabhi Baja (2018)
 Choti Choti Batain (2019)

Philippine drama 
Maalaala Mo Kaya (1991–present)
Magpakailanman (2002–07, 2012–present)

Thai drama 
 Girl From Nowhere (2018–present)

Animated 
 Adventures from the Book of Virtues (1996–2000)
 Andersen Monogatari (1971)
 Animal Stories (1998–2001)
 Animated Tales of the World (2001–03)
 Ayakashi: Samurai Horror Tales (2006)
 The Bob Clampett Show (2000–2001)
 Bugs 'n' Daffy (1995–98)
 The Bugs Bunny Show (1960–2000)
 A Bunch of Munsch (1991–92)
 Cartoon Alley (2004–07)
 The Cartoonstitute (2010)
 The Cat&Birdy Warneroonie PinkyBrainy Big Cartoonie Show (1999–2000)
 CB Bears (1977–78)
 The Chuck Jones Show (2001–02)
 Ciné si (1989)
 The Comic Strip (1987)
 Cream Lemon (1984–87)
 DC Nation Shorts (2011–14)
 Donald Duck Presents (1983–92)
 Donald's Quack Attack (1992–2000)
 Dragons et princesses (2010)
 Fabulous Funnies (1978–79)
 The Fairytaler (2002–03)
 Famous Classic Tales (1970–84)
 Festival of Family Classics (1972–73)
 Force Five (1980–89)
 Freaky Stories (1997–2000)
 Fred Flintstone and Friends (1978–79)
 Funpak (2005)
 General Electric Fantasy Hour (c. 1960s)
 Good Morning, Mickey! (1983–92)
 The Great Book of Nature (1999–2000)
 Grimm's Fairy Tale Classics (1987–88)
 Grizzly Tales for Gruesome Kids (2000–12)
 The Hanna-Barbera New Cartoon Series (1962–63)
 Hanna–Barbera's World of Super Adventure (1979–84)
 Happily Ever After: Fairy Tales for Every Child (1995–2000)
 The Harveytoons Show (1950–62)
 HBO Storybook Musicals (1987–93)
 House of Mouse (2001–03)
 Infinity Train (2019–21)
 The Ink and Paint Club (1997–98)
 KaBlam! (1996–2000)
 Kaboodle (1987–90)
 Kideo TV (1986–87)
 The Kwicky Koala Show (1981–82)
 Late Night, Black and White (1996–2003)
 Legends of Bikini Bottom (2011)
 A Little Curious (1999–2000)
 Manga Sekai Mukashi Banashi (1976–79)
 Mad (2010–13)
 The Marvel Super Heroes (1966)
 The Merrie Melodies Show (1972)
 Merrie Melodies Starring Bugs Bunny & Friends (1990–92)
 Mickey Mouse and Friends (1994–95)
 Mickey Mouse Works (1999–2000)
 Mickey's Mouse Tracks (1992–95)
 Mighty Mouse Playhouse (1955–67)
 Mononoke (2007)
 The Mouse Factory (1972–73)
 The Moxy Show (1993–95)
 My Little Pony (1986–87)
 The New Woody Woodpecker Show (1999–2002)
 O Canada (1997–2002)
 Oh Yeah! Cartoons (1998–2001)
 Peanuts (2016)
 The Pink Panther Show (1969–80)
 The Popeye Show (2001–03)
 The Porky Pig Show (1964–67)
 Princes et princesses (1989)
 Random! Cartoons (2008–09)
 Raw Toonage (1992–93)
 Right Now Kapow (2016–17)
 The Road Runner Show (1966–72)
 Rumic Theater (2003–04)
 Saturday Supercade (1983–84)
 Shelley Duvall's Bedtime Stories (1992–93)
 Short Circutz (1994–96)
 Shorts in a Bunch (2007–08)
 Shorty McShorts' Shorts (2006–07)
 Super Sunday (1985–86)
 Super Why! (2007–16)
 Tales From the Cryptkeeper (1993–2000)
 The Tex Avery Show (1996–2002)
 Timeless Tales from Hallmark (1990–91)
 ToonHeads (1992–2003)
 Toon In with Me (2021–present)
 Totally Tooned In (1999–2000)
 Two More Eggs (2015–17)
 The Wacky World of Tex Avery (1997)
 What a Cartoon! (1995–97)
 The Woody Woodpecker Show (1958–59)
 The World of Peter Rabbit and Friends (1992–95)
 Zootopia+ (2022–present)

Adult animation 
 The Boys Presents: Diabolical (2022)
 Cake (2019–present)
 Cartoon Sushi (1997–98)
 Greatest Party Story Ever (2016)
 Jokebook (1982)
 Like, Share, Die (2015)
 Liquid Television (1991–94)
 Love, Death & Robots (2019–present)
 Off the Air (2011–present)
 Party Legends (2016–17)
 Robot Chicken (2005–present)
 Spicy City (1997)
 Sunday Pants (2005–06)

Children and family 
 ABC Afterschool Special (1972–97)
 ABC Weekend Special (1977–97)
 CBS Afternoon Playhouse (1978–83)
 CBS Children's Film Festival (1967–78)
 CBS Children's Mystery Theatre (1980–82)
 CBS Schoolbreak Special (1984–96)
 CBS Storybreak (1985–87)
 Disneyland (1954–58)
 Dramarama (1983–89)
 Faerie Tale Theatre (1982–87)
 The Fox Cubhouse (1994–96) (contains Johnson and Friends, Jim Henson's Animal Show, Rimba's Island, Magic Adventures of Mumfie and Budgie the Little Helicopter)
 It's Itsy Bitsy Time (1999) (contains Budgie the Little Helicopter, 64 Zoo Lane, The Animal Shelf, Tom and Vicky and Charley and Mimmo)
 Jackanory (UK, 1972–85)
 Lift Off (1992–95)
 NBC Children's Theatre (1963–73)
 Noddy (1998–2000)
 Off to See the Wizard (1967–68)
 Once Upon a Classic (1976–80)
 Shining Time Station (1989–93)
 Shirley Temple's Storybook (1958–61)
 Special Treat, also known as NBC Special Treat (1975–86)
 Tall Tales and Legends (1985–87)
 Walt Disney Presents (1958–61)
 Walt Disney's Wonderful World of Color (1961–69)
 The Wonderful World of Disney (1969–2009)
 WonderWorks (1984)
 The Wubbulous World of Dr. Seuss (1996–98)

Comedies 
 The Comic Strip Presents... (1982–2015)
 Carol and Company (1990–91)
 Cilla's Comedy Six (UK, 1975)
 Cilla's World of Comedy (UK, 1976)
 Comedy Lab (1998–)
 Comedy Playhouse (UK, 1961–2014)
 Dear Uge (2016–)
 Dr. Terrible's House of Horrible (2001)
 The Eddie Cantor Comedy Theatre (1955)
 El Chapulín Colorado (1973–79)
 Ripping Yarns (UK, 1978–79)
 George Burns Comedy Week (1985)
 Good Heavens (1976)
 The Guest Book (2017–18)
 High Maintenance (2012–15, 2016–present)
 Human Remains (2000)
 Inside No. 9 (2014–)
 Oboler Comedy Theater (1949)
 Love, American Style (1969–74)
 Miracle Workers (2019–present)
 Murder Most Horrid (UK, 1991–99)
 The Ronnie Barker Playhouse (UK, 1968)
 Seven of One (UK, 1973)
 Six Dates with Barker (UK, 1971)
 Undressed (1999–2002)

Crime dramas 

 Adventure Theater (1956)
 American Crime (2015–17)
 American Crime Story (2016–)
 Agatha Christie's Marple (UK, 2005–14)
 Agatha Christie's Poirot (UK, 1989–2014)
 The Big Story (1949–58)
 The Black Robe, also known as Police Night Court (1949–50)
 Crime Patrol (2003–)
 Fargo (2014–)
 FBI: The Untold Stories (1991–93)
 Gang Busters (1952, 1954–55)
 Lawbreakers (1963–64)
 The Man Behind the Badge (1953–55)
 Official Detective (1957–58)
 Police Call (1955)
 Police Story (1952)
 Police Story (1973–78)
 Tatort (1970–)
 The Rivals of Sherlock Holmes (UK, 1971–73)
 They Stand Accused (1949–52, 1954)
 True Detective (2014–19)
 Underbelly (2008–)
 The Walter Winchell File (1957–58)
 The Whistler (1954–55)
 The Sinner (2017–21)

Educational 
 Inside/Out (1972–73)
 Omnibus (US, 1952–61)

Historical 
 Captain Newfoundland from the Tip of Atlantis/Captain Atlantis Late Night (Canada, 1972–present)
 The Great Adventure (1963–64)
 Our American Heritage (1959–61)
 Profiles in Courage (1964–65)
 Saga of Western Man (1963–69)
 You are There (1953–57)

Medical 
 The Doctor, also known as The Visitor (1952–53)
 Medic (1954–56)
 Medical Story (1975–76)

Military 
 Flight (1958–59)
 Men of Annapolis (1957–58)
 Navy Log (1955–58)
 The Silent Service (1957–59)
 The West Point Story aka West Point (1956–57)

Mystery and suspense 
 Alfred Hitchcock Presents (1955–65)
 Alfred Hitchcock Presents (1985–89)
 Behind Closed Doors (1958 TV series) (1958–59)
 The Best in Mystery (1954)
 The Boris Karloff Mystery Playhouse (1949)
 Byline, also known as Adventures in Mystery and News Gal (1951)
 The Chevy Mystery Show (1960)
 The Clock (1949–52)
 Danger (1950–55)
 Dark of Night (1952–54)
 Darkroom (1981–82)
 Dow Hour of Great Mysteries (1960)
 The Edgar Wallace Mystery Theatre (US TV version of British theatrical second features, 1960–65)
 Escape (1950)
 Escape (1973)
 Espionage (1963–64)
 Eye Witness (1953)
 Fallen Angels (1993–95)
 George Sanders Mystery Theater (1957)
 Gun (1997)
 Hands of Mystery, also known as Hands of Destiny, Hands of Murder (1949–52)
 The Hitchhiker (1983–87)
 I Spy (1955–57)
 Inner Sanctum (1954)
 Invitation Playhouse: Mind Over Murder (1952)
 Kraft Mystery Theatre (Summer 1961, 1962, 1963)
 Kraft Suspense Theatre (1963–65)
 Mr. Arsenic (1952)
 Murder in Mind (2001–03)
 Murder Most Horrid (UK, 1991–99)
 Mystery! (1980–)
 Panic! (1957–58)
 Philip Morris Playhouse (1953–54)
 Rebound, also known as Counterpoint (1952–53)
 Scene of the Crime (1991–92)
 Stage 13 (1950)
 Sure as Fate (1950–51)
 Suspense (1949–54)
 Suspicion (1957–58)
 Target (1958)
 Twisted Tales (1996–97)
 Two Twisted (2006) (Sequel to Twisted Tales)
 The Vise (1955 TV series) (1955–57)
 Volume One (1949)
 The Web (1950–54)
 The Web, syndication title Undercurrent (1957)
 Your Play Time (1953–55)

Religious

Science fiction and horror

Westerns

Film 

Anthology film series are rare compared to their TV and radio counterparts. There have been several attempts within the horror genre to have a franchise with an anthology format, such as with the Halloween franchise where the third film, Halloween: Season of the Witch, was meant to be the beginning of a series of anthology horror films, but due to negative reception that plan was shelved.

Drama series

Genre

Video games 

Anthology video games have seen very rare in the 1980s and onwards.

See also 

 Anthology
 Anthology film
 Limited-run series

References

External links 
 National Audio Theatre: "Inebriate of Air: A Short History of Contemporary American Radio Drama" by Sarah Montague, (June 8, 1999)
 Classic TV Archive

 
Radio formats
Television genres
Television terminology
Films by type
 

fr:Série télévisée#Anthologie